Trapezitinae is a subfamily of the Hesperiidae ("skippers") family of butterflies. They are found only in New Guinea and Australia. The subfamily contains about 60 species in 19 genera.

Genera
 Anisynta Lower, 1911
 Antipodia Atkins, 1984
 Croitana Waterhouse, 1932
 Dispar Waterhouse & Lyell, 1914
 Felicena Waterhouse, 1932
 Herimosa Atkins, 1994
 Hesperilla Hewitson, 1868
 Hewitsoniella Shepard, 1931
 Mesodina Meyrick, 1901
 Motasingha Watson, 1893
 Neohesperilla Waterhouse & Lyell, 1914
 Oreisplanus Waterhouse & Lyell, 1914
 Pasma Waterhouse, 1932
 Prada Evans, 1949
 Proeidosa Atkins, 1973
 Signeta Waterhouse & Lyell, 1914
 Rachelia Hemming, 1964
 Toxidia Mabille, 1891
 Trapezites Hübner, 1819

References
Ackery, P.R., de Jong, R and Vane-Wright, R.I. (1999). The Butterflies: Hedyloidea, Hesperioidea and Papilionoidae. pp. 263–300 in Kristensen, N.P. (Ed.). Lepidoptera, Moths and Butterflies. Volume 1: Evolution, Systematics, and Biogeography. Handbuch der Zoologie. Eine Naturgeschichte der Stämme des Tierreiches / Handbook of Zoology. A Natural History of the phyla of the Animal Kingdom. Band / Volume IV Arthropoda: Insecta Teilband / Part 35: 491 pp. Walter de Gruyter, Berlin, New York.(Hesperioidea de Jong)

External links

TOL
Flickr Images

 
Butterfly subfamilies